Roy Hilton Hasson (1921-1968) was an Australian rugby league player who played in the 1940s and 1950s. He was a New South Wales state representative half who won the 1941 premiership with St George and later finished his career with Canterbury-Bankstown.

Playing career
Roy 'Torchy' Hasson played with St George for five seasons between 1940 & 1944 and then Canterbury-Bankstown between 1946 & 1950. He won a premiership with St George in 1941, before moving to Canterbury after the war. He played in Canterbury-Bankstown's losing 1947 Grand Final and captained the 'Berries' during 1948. Hasson represented New South Wales on one occasion in 1947.

Death
He died at his Bondi Beach home on 23 December 1968 aged 47.

Published sources
 Whiticker, Alan & Hudson, Glen (2006) The Encyclopedia of Rugby League Players, Gavin Allen Publishing, Sydney
 Haddan, Steve (2007) The Finals - 100 Years of National Rugby League Finals, Steve Haddan Publishing, Brisbane

References

St. George Dragons players
Canterbury-Bankstown Bulldogs players
New South Wales rugby league team players
Australian rugby league players
1921 births
1968 deaths
Rugby league five-eighths
Rugby league halfbacks